Autosticha tetragonopa is a moth in the family Autostichidae. It was described by Edward Meyrick in 1935. It is found in China and Japan (Honshu, Kyushu).

The wingspan is 14–15 mm. The forewings are yellowish white with large discal stigmata.

References

Moths described in 1935
Autosticha
Moths of Asia
Moths of Japan